Dagoberto Godoy Fuentealba (22 July 1893 – 8 September 1960) was a Chilean military pilot and the first person to fly over the Andes.

Biography
Godoy was born in Temuco, the son of Abraham Godoy and Clotilde Fuentealba. He was orphaned at the age of two and was raised by his maternal aunt Petronila y Tránsito Fuentealba.

He entered the Escuela Militar del Libertador Bernardo O'Higgins military school in 1910, destined for a posting in the Batallón de Ferrocarrileros ("Railway Battalion") of the Army Engineers. In 1915 he requested a transfer to the Servicio de Aviación Militar de Chile ("Military Aviation Service of Chile"), and spent a year at the School of Military Aeronautics before graduating, and being promoted to lieutenant on 12 February 1916. He took part in several international competitions in 1916, winning the President of the Republic Prize, and coming second in a race held in Buenos Aires.

In mid-1918 Chile received twelve Bristol M.1c aircraft from Britain. Major Victor Huston, a British flying ace, also arrived to assist in training the Chileans. In December Godoy, encouraged by Huston, obtained permission of the head of air service, Pedro Dartnell, to attempt a crossing the Andes, taking advantage of the Bristols superior performance to any aircraft they previously had.

On 12 December 1918, flying Bristol M.1c C4988, Godoy took off from the airfield of El Bosque, and flew past Tupungato, through the mountain passes of Cristo Redentor and Uspallata, passing close to the summit of Aconcagua, before landing in a field in Lagunitas, close to Mendoza, Argentina. Unfortunately he crashed into a fence, damaging his landing gear, propeller and starboard wing, and hitting his head on the dashboard, receiving a slight concussion. Godoy eventually returned to Chile to public acclaim, and was promoted to captain.

Godoy left the army on 15 July 1924, and married Ernestina Lisbon Uribe the following year, with whom he had six children. In 1930 the Chilean Air Force was created as an independent branch, and in 1936, Godoy was granted the honorary rank of Capitán de Bandada. In 1952 Godoy was promoted to the honorary rank of Comandante de Grupo, and to General de Brigada Aérea in 1957.

Godoy died in Santiago de Chile on 8 September 1960.

References

1893 births
1960 deaths
People from Temuco
Chilean aviators
Chilean Army officers
Chilean Air Force officers
20th-century Chilean military personnel